Takyeh (also Romanized as Tekyeh; also known as Takiyeh Ghareh Kariz) is a village in Qarah Kahriz Rural District, Qarah Kahriz District, Shazand County, Markazi Province, Iran. At the 2006 census, its population was 162, in 38 families.

References 

Populated places in Shazand County